Jammers were an American boogie music group led by Richie Weeks and consisting of the members of Instant Funk, Weeks & Co and various Salsoul Records acts. Their hit song Be Mine Tonight, composed by singer-songwriter Margaret Blount and producer Richie Weeks, was released in 1982 on Salsoul Records. Their other song entering charts was And You Know That, peaking at No. 19 on the Billboard Dance chart, as of January 8, 1983.
Together with "Be Mine Tonight", it entered the same chart as a double single, reaching No. 37. In March 1983, it was already number 79. The songs also hit the R&B chart. In the United Kingdom, "Be Mine Tonight" peaked at No. 65 on the UK Singles Chart. Last appearance position was number 70.

Group
The band's material was provided, produced and arranged by Richie Weeks of club/boogie group Weeks & Co. Shep Pettibone was involved in mixing of their material. Album session musicians include Warren Benbow, Jocelyn Brown and Debbi Blackwell Cook, Sheldon Weeks on lead vocals. Other members include, bass guitarist Raymond Earl, keyboardist Dennis Richardson, and drummer Scotty Miller from Instant Funk and saxophonist Roy Nathanson, members of New York City Strings, salsa trombonist Barry Rogers, jazz trumpeter Earl Gardner.

They recorded three singles ("And You Know That", "Be Mine Tonight", and "Let's B-B Break") and one eponymous album in total.

Discography

Album

Singles

1: Charted with "And You Know That".

References

Musical groups established in 1982
Musical groups disestablished in 1984
Electronic music groups from New York (state)
American dance music groups
American garage house musicians
American post-disco music groups
Salsoul Records artists
1982 establishments in the United States